Pack is a legacy Unix shell compression program based on Huffman coding.

The unpack utility will restore files to their original state after they have been compressed using the pack utility. If no files are specified, the standard input will be uncompressed to the standard output.

Although obsolete, support for packed files exists in modern compression tools such as gzip and 7-zip.

Description of program 
Files compressed by pack are typically given the extension ".z" (not to be confused with the ".Z" of compress). Files can be returned to their original state using unpack. In addition, there may also be a pcat command which reads in a compressed file and sends its output to stdout.

See also 
 Data compression
 Image compression
 List of Unix commands

References

External links 
 pack(1) in The Single UNIX Specification, Version 2, 1997, opengroup.org
 C.4 Utilities in The Open Group Base Specifications Issue 6, opengroup.org – indicates pack as excluded
 
 
 Pack command Manual

Data compression software
Unix archivers and compression-related utilities